The 199th (2/1st Manchester) Brigade was an infantry brigade formation of  the British Army that saw active service during the First World War as part of 66th (2nd East Lancashire) Division and was reformed as 199th Infantry Brigade in the Second World War, serving with 55th (West Lancashire) Infantry Division until August 1944 when it was redesignated 166th Infantry Brigade.

First World War

It was raised as a second line brigade, and was formed as a duplicate of the Manchester Brigade, originally with the title of 2/1st Manchester Brigade. The brigade, composed of four battalions of the Manchester Regiment, was part of the 2nd East Lancashire Division, and consisting of the men in the Territorial Force who, upon being asked to serve overseas after the outbreak of war, originally had not agreed to serve overseas. The brigades' original intention was to provide drafts of replacements for the first line units serving overseas.

However, due to conscription being introduced and the Military Service Act of 1916, the brigade, by now titled 199th (2/1st Manchester) Brigade, eventually ended up serving with the 66th Division as part of the British Expeditionary Force (BEF) on the Western Front. The brigade fought in the Battle of Passchendaele in late 1917. The brigade also saw service during Operation Michael in March 1918, part of the German Army's Spring Offensive, and, as with the rest of the division, suffered extremely heavy casualties. The brigade and division were later reformed and saw service during the final Hundred Days Offensive, which ended with the Armistice of 11 November 1918.

Order of battle
The 199th Brigade was constituted as follows:
 2/5th Battalion, Manchester Regiment
 2/6th Battalion, Manchester Regiment 	
 2/7th Battalion, Manchester Regiment
 2/8th Battalion, Manchester Regiment 
 6th Battalion, Lancashire Fusiliers
 2/9th Battalion, Manchester Regiment 
 5th (Service) Battalion, Connaught Rangers
 18th (Service) Battalion, King's (Liverpool Regiment) 
 204th Machine Gun Company, Machine Gun Corps
 199th Trench Mortar Battery

Second World War
The brigade was disbanded after the war along with the whole of the Territorial Force which was reformed in 1920 as the Territorial Army. The brigade was also reformed in 1939 just before the Second World War as the war clouds with Nazi Germany were fast approaching and war was becoming increasingly likely. The brigade was reformed as the 199th Infantry Brigade and was again assigned to the 66th (East Lancashire) Division. However, after the British Expeditionary Force was evacuated from France, the 66th Division was disbanded in June 1940. The brigade was later assigned to the 55th (West Lancashire) Infantry Division, serving with it for the rest of the war, and in 1944, was redesignated the 166th Infantry Brigade. The brigade saw many changes in its infantry battalions throughout the war and never saw active service outside the United Kingdom.

Order of battle
 2/8th Battalion, Lancashire Fusiliers
 6th Battalion, Manchester Regiment
 7th Battalion, Manchester Regiment

References

Infantry brigades of the British Army in World War I
Infantry brigades of the British Army in World War II
B199
Military units and formations in Manchester
Manchester Regiment
Military units and formations established in 1914
Military units and formations disestablished in 1919
Military units and formations established in 1939